The Assam Chronicle is an English language newspaper published from Guwahati, Assam, India.

References

External links 
 

English-language newspapers published in India
Newspapers published in Assam